Second Mesa is a census-designated place (CDP) in Navajo County, Arizona, on the Hopi Reservation, atop the 5,700-foot (1,740 m) mesa. As of the 2010 census, the CDP population was 962, spread among three Hopi Indian villages, Musungnuvi (or Mishongnovi), Supawlavi (or Sipaulovi), and Songoopavi (or Shungopavi). The Hopi Cultural Center is on Second Mesa.

Geography

Second Mesa is located at  (35.817613, -110.504281).

Demographics

At the 2000 census there were 814 people, 209 households, and 169 families in the CDP. There were 255 housing units at an average density of 9.6/sq mi (3.7/km). The racial makeup of the CDP was 97% Native American, 1% White, <1% Asian, <1% from other races, and 2% from two or more races.  <1% of the population were Hispanic or Latino of any race.
Of the 209 households 46% had children under the age of 18 living with them, 45% were married couples living together, 34% had a female householder with no husband present, and 19% were non-families. 17% of households were one person and 8.1% were one person aged 65 or older.  The average household size was 3.9 and the average family size was 4.4.

The age distribution was 40% under the age of 18, 10% from 18 to 24, 25% from 25 to 44, 17% from 45 to 64, and 8% 65 or older.  The median age was 25 years. For every 100 females, there were 95 males.  For every 100 females age 18 and over, there were 91 males.

The median household income was $22,981 and the median family income  was $23,947. Males had a median income of $22,679 versus $21,898 for females. The per capita income for the CDP was $6,089.  About 33% of families and 36% of the population were below the poverty line, including 37% of those under age 18 and 23.8% of those age 65 or over.

Education
Second Mesa is a part of the Cedar Unified School District. Hopi High School serves Second Mesa.

The Hopi Lavayi Nest Model Program, a pilot Hopi language revitalization project for families with children birth through age five was launched in the village of Sipaulovi."

References

External links

Hopi Cultural Center, Second Mesa

Mesas of Arizona
Census-designated places in Navajo County, Arizona
Hopi
Hopi Reservation
History of Navajo County, Arizona